"Three Wooden Crosses" is a song written by Kim Williams and Doug Johnson, and recorded by American country music singer Randy Travis.  It was released in November 2002 from his album, Rise and Shine.  The song became Travis' 16th and final Number One single, his first since "Whisper My Name" in 1994. "Three Wooden Crosses" was named Song of the Year by the Country Music Association in 2003 and won a Dove Award from the Gospel Music Association as Country Song of the Year in 2004.

Content
The song describes four passengers – a farmer on vacation, a teacher seeking higher education, a hooker and a preacher, both of whom were "searching for lost souls," on a mid-night bus traveling from the United States to Mexico.  The bus is involved in a fatal accident when the bus driver doesn't see a stop sign and the bus is hit by an 18-wheeler which kills three of the four passengers; the lyrics ask why there are only three crosses and not four. (There is no mention of what happened to the drivers of either vehicle.)

The song mentions that the farmer and teacher were killed in the wreck, with the farmer leaving a harvest and a son who would follow in his footsteps, and the teacher leaving knowledge in the children she taught.  It also mentions that the preacher lays his bloodstained Bible in the hands of the hooker, asking her if she could "see the Promised Land."

The end of the song reveals that the story was being told by a preacher during Sunday church services.  In a twist, however, it reveals that the hooker survived and had a son. The preacher telling the story is in fact the son of the hooker (holding up the bloodstained Bible as proof), who read the Bible that had been given to her by the dying preacher; in turn, her son eventually became a preacher himself.

Critical reception
Deborah Evans Price, of Billboard magazine reviewed the song favorably, calling it a "beautifully written tale of faith and redemption." She goes on to say that Travis has never sounded better, "and his warm baritone perfectly conveys every nuance in the lyric."

Chart performance
"Three Wooden Crosses" debuted at number 52 on the Hot Country Singles & Tracks chart dated December 7, 2002. It charted for 34 weeks on that chart, and reached number 1 on the chart dated May 24, 2003, giving Travis his sixteenth Number One single, his first Billboard Number One since "Whisper My Name" in 1994. In addition, it reached the Top 40 on the Billboard Hot 100 chart (peaking at #31), making it his first and (excluding guest singles) only top-40 hit on that chart.

Year-end charts

References

2002 singles
2002 songs
Randy Travis songs
Song recordings produced by Kyle Lehning
Songs written by Doug Johnson (record producer)
Curb Records singles
Word Records singles
Songs written by Kim Williams (songwriter)
Songs about prostitutes
Songs about buses